Reginald Norman 'Woody' Wood (?– February 19, 2015) was an American ice hockey player and head coach who headed the program at Princeton for six years.

Career
A Massachusetts native, Wood attended Harvard in the early 1950s, playing varsity hockey for 3 years and serving as team captain in his senior season. After graduating Wood served in the military before returning to college hockey as a head coach for Princeton in 1959. Wood's first season with the Tigers was a mild success as the team compiled a winning season for the first time in four years but afterwards the club lost ground and routinely finished near the bottom of the newly created ECAC Hockey standings. He stayed with the program until 1965 before stepping down in favor of John E. Wilson.

After leaving Princeton Wood returned to Massachusetts and joined the Boston-area real estate firm of Hunneman & Company. In 1969 he was elected as president and CEO of National Realty Investors and later became president of Moors & Cabot Properties, Inc.

Personal life
While living in Massachusetts Wood became a season ticket holder for the Boston Bruins and would regularly take his sons to games. His eldest, Randy, ended up playing in the NHL for several years and was followed by Norman's grandson Miles Wood who made his NHL debut with the New Jersey Devils in 2016.

Norman Wood died at Kaplan house on February 19, 2015, at the age of 84.

Head coaching record

References 

Year of birth unknown
2015 deaths
American ice hockey coaches
Harvard Crimson men's ice hockey players
Princeton Tigers men's ice hockey coaches
People from Marblehead, Massachusetts
Ice hockey coaches from Massachusetts
Sportspeople from Essex County, Massachusetts
Ice hockey players from Massachusetts